HMS Marlborough was a 74-gun third rate ship of the line of the Royal Navy, launched on 22 June 1807 at Deptford. In 1807, she helped escort the Portuguese royal family in its flight from Portugal to Brazil. In 1812 Marlborough became the flagship to Rear-Admiral Sir George Cockburn off Cadiz, from where she went to the North America Station and took part in the capture of Washington in August 1814.

Marlborough was laid up in Ordinary at Portsmouth from 1816 and broken up there in July 1835.

Notes

References

 Hannings, Bud. (2012). The War of 1812: A Complete Chronology with Biographies of 63 General Officers. Jefferson, North Carolina: McFarland. 
 Lavery, Brian (2003) The Ship of the Line - Volume 1: The development of the battlefleet 1650–1850. Conway Maritime Press. .

Ships of the line of the Royal Navy
Fame-class ships of the line
1807 ships
Ships built in Deptford
War of 1812 ships of the United Kingdom